Halticini is a tribe of plant bugs in the family Miridae.

Genera
BioLib includes the following:
 Acratheus Distant, 1910
 Anapomella V.G. Putshkov, 1961
 Anapus Stål, 1858 i c g b
 Barbarosia Kiyak, 1995
 Chorosomella Horváth, 1906
 Coridromius Signoret, 1862 i c g b
 Dampierella Tatarnic, 2009
 Dasyscytus Fieber, 1864
 Dimorphocoris Reuter, 1891
 Ectmetopterus Reuter, 1906
 Euryopicoris Reuter, 1875
 Goodeniaphila Tatarnic, 2009
 Halticus Hahn, 1832 i c g b (fleahoppers)
 Labopella Knight, 1929 i c g b
 Labops Burmeister, 1835 i c g b
 Microtechnites c g b
 Myrmecophyes Fieber, 1870 i c g
 Namaquacapsus Schuh, 1974
 Nanniella Reuter, 1904
 Nesidiorchestes Kirkaldy, 1902 i c g
 Orthocephalus Fieber, 1858 i c g b
 Pachytomella Reuter, 1891
 Piezocranum Horváth, 1877
 Plagiotylus Scott, 1874
 Platyporus Reuter, 1890
 Schoenocoris Reuter, 1891
 Scirtetellus Reuter, 1890
 Strongylocoris Blanchard, 1840

Data sources: i = ITIS, c = Catalogue of Life, g = GBIF, b = Bugguide.net

References

Further reading

External links

 

Orthotylinae